Suganesh Mahendran (born 17 February 1990) is an Indian cricketer. He played as vice-captain 2019 Physical disability world series and won the series. He lost his left hand in a motorbike accident.

References 

1990 births
Living people
Indian cricketers
Tamil Nadu cricketers